François Jonquet (born ), is a French Berlin-based writer and art critic.
He is a member of the International Association of Art Critics (AICA). His specialism as a writer is to alternate novels and biographies.

Since 2005, he has contributed to the bilingual journal (French, English) art press founded by the art critic and writer Catherine Millet. 

He is the author of the illustrated work of reference about the British art duo, Gilbert & George, Intimate Conversations with François Jonquet, Phaidon 2005. It comprises a distillation of interviews.

In 2000, he reconnected with an acquaintance from his youth. During his years nightclubbing, François Jonquet had hung out with Jenny Bel'Air, the star of the French underground of the seventies and eighties. A mixed-race transvestite, Jenny had been the physiognomist for Fabrice Emaer's legendary nightclub, Le Palace. A biography was published a year later, (Jenny Bel'Air, une créature, Éditions Pauvert, 2001).

Et me voici vivant (Sabine Wespieser Éditeur, 2006), is an account of his descent into madness.

He had another remarkable meeting in 2007, this time with Daniel Emilfork. François Jonquet went on to recount the final years of the life of this great theatrical actor. Largely typecast as an evil character in feature films because of his extraordinary face, his role in The City of Lost Children is a notable example, (Daniel, Sabine Wespieser Éditeur, 2008).

His coming-of-age novel, Les Vrais Paradis, (Sabine Wespieser Éditeur, 2014), is set in the Parisian nightclub, Le Palace, during the years 1979–84.

A personal portrait of Valérie Lang – the actress, political activist and daughter of Jack Lang, former Minister of Culture of President François Mitterrand – was published in 2018. (Je veux brûler tout mon temps, Seuil). She died suddenly at the age of forty-seven.

Books

Novels 
 Et me voici vivant, Sabine Wespieser Éditeur, 2006 
 Les Vrais Paradis, Sabine Wespieser Éditeur, 2014

Biographies 
 Jenny Bel'Air, une créature, Éditions Pauvert, 2001  (paperback: Éditions Points, 2021 )
 Daniel, Sabine Wespieser Éditeur, 2008 
 Je veux brûler tout mon temps, Seuil, 2018

Art books 
 Hiquily, Cercle d'art, 1992 
 Gilbert & George, intimate conversations with François Jonquet, Phaidon, 2005

Publications in collective works (a selection) 
 Claude Lévêque: Le Grand Soir, Venise 2009, Flammarion, 2009, bilingual (French/English) 
 Les grands entretiens d'artpress. La Photographie 4. L'image construite, art press, 2016 
 Dancing with Myself, exhibition Catalogue Pinault Collection, Marsilio, 2018 
 Gilbert & George, Interview in November 2017 by François Jonquet, Pinault Collection Magazine, issue 10, 2018

Portraits of artists and Interviews online 
 https://francoisjonquet.academia.edu/research%20Academia.edu

TV 
 Les Années Palace , by François Jonquet, directed by Chantal Lasbats (2005, France 5, 1h20). The film can be viewed on Dailymotion (French version)

Notes and References 

French writers
French art critics
1961 births
Living people